The Indian locomotive class WDG-3A is a class of diesel-electric locomotive that was developed in 1994 by Banaras Locomotive Works (BLW),Varanasi for Indian Railways. The model name stands for broad-gauge (W), Diesel (D), Goods traffic (G) engine, 3,100 hp (3A) locomotive. They entered service on 18 July 1995. A total of 1,164 WDG-3A units were built between 1994 and 2015 at BLW, Varanasi with a few units being produced by Diesel Loco Modernisation Works (DLMW) and Parel Workshop.

It is the dedicated freight version of the very successful WDM-2 and shares the same engine and horsepower rating with WDM-3A. It is considered to be a successful locomotive class with high reliability and few maintenance problems. Despite the introduction of more modern types of locomotives like WDG-4 and electrification, a significant number are still in use, both in mainline and departmental duties. 

As of April 2022, 1047 locomotives still retain "operational status" on the mainline as WDG-3A, with a few examples having been converted to WAGC3 or WAG-10.

History 

The first units of this class was delivered on July 18, 1995, under the name of WDG-2. The class was manufactured till end of 2015. All the older locomotives built by DLW had regular WDM-2 type square short hood profile and control stand position and the locomotives are rated at 3,100 HP.

From 2009 onward, they are equipped with Daulat Ram DBR, microprocessor control and an Auxiliary Power Unit (APU) in the short hood thus they bear external resemblance to the WDM-3D class. The WDG3A has higher Tractive Effort (7.5 t more) and Axle Load (1.7 t) compared to the WDM3A despite having the same engine and horsepower rating. Many units of this class has been named "Shakti" and can easily be recognized by their orange livery with cream stripe & lightning bolts. Besides IR, WDG-3A are being use by private companies for industrial uses, thermal power plants, port trusts, etc.

Production was stopped in 2015 when Advanced locomotives like the WDG-4D were built, thus rendering the ALCO platform obsolete. Two WDG-4s can haul more goods than three WDG-3A combined. Meanwhile, Diesel Loco Works in Varanasi rebuilt few of the existing locomotives that had reached midlife into a purely electric twin section 10,000 hp (7,457 kW) locomotive, classifying them as the WAGC3.

The retirement of this class has begun due to electrification.

Sub Classes

WDG-3B 
They were an experimental technical variant of the WDG3A with an upgraded ALCO engine to output 3,200 hp. But the experiment was unsuccessful and all units were reverted to normal WDG-3A. One of the locomotives of this class was numbered #14796.

WDG-3C 
Another experimental class, but this time rated at 3300 hp. Only one unit (#14962) was produced and was painted in a unique "Dark Rose/Cheetah" livery. This loco was derated to 2,600 hp, but is still with the Katni diesel locomotive shed. This class was unsuccessful as well.

WDG-3D 
Freight version of the WDM-3D. Only one (#13301) unit was marked with this marking. It may possibly be rated at 3400 hp. Now it has been derated to 2600 hp with WDG-3A class markings and homed at the Vatva Loco Shed.

Locomotive sheds

WDG-3A Converted into Electric Locomotive WAGC-3 

In 2018, Chittaranjan Locomotive Works, Banaras Locomotive Works and Research Design and Standards Organisation converted a WDG-3A into a purely electric, twin-section 10,000 hp (7,457 kW) locomotive, classified as the WAGC3. This locomotive was the result of the initiative taken up by the Railway Board in November 2017, asking RDSO to work out details of conversion of diesel locos to electric locos. RDSO had suggested that such conversion would be possible with retaining the Motorized Truck assembly (which includes traction motors and drive side traction converters), computer controlled brakes (CCBs) and other relevant parts, suitably redesigning the under-frame and superstructure and adding the conversion kit. It was completed in only 69 days. Both units will together be considered as one asset and one locomotive by Indian Railways. Only a single unit has been produced so far and it is in service. It has been given to Bondamumda Shed of SER.

Technical specifications
Technical details are as follows:

See also
Indian locomotive class WDM-3A
Indian locomotive class WDM-2
List of diesel locomotives of India
Indian Railways
Rail transport in India

References

G-2 3A
Co-Co locomotives
Banaras Locomotive Works locomotives
5 ft 6 in gauge locomotives
Railway locomotives introduced in 1994